Becker High School is a public high school in Becker, Minnesota, United States. Becker High School enrolls grades 9-12 and has an enrollment of approximately 800 students. It is the only high school located in Minnesota Public School District 726.

Notable alumni
 Mark Douglas Olson, former member of Minnesota House of Representatives, Districts 16B and 19A
 Matt Veldman, NFL tight end
 Dillon Radunz, NFL Offensive Tackle

References

External links
Official website
Student run website

Public high schools in Minnesota
Schools in Sherburne County, Minnesota